The 2018–19 Canisius Golden Griffins men's basketball team represented Canisius College in the 2018–19 NCAA Division I men's basketball season. They played their home games at the Koessler Athletic Center in Buffalo, New York as members of the Metro Atlantic Athletic Conference, and were led by 3rd-year head coach Reggie Witherspoon. They finished the 2018–19 season 15–17 overall, 11–7 in MAAC play to finish in a four-way tie for second place. As the No. 2 seed in the 2019 MAAC tournament, they defeated No. 7 seed Manhattan in the quarterfinals 69–65OT before falling to No. 6 seed Monmouth 59–73 in the semifinals.

Previous season
The Golden Griffins finished the 2017–18 season 21–11, 15–3 in MAAC play to finish in a share for the MAAC regular season title with Rider. It was their first conference regular season title since 1994. As the No. 2 seed at the MAAC tournament, they were upset by in the quarterfinals by No. 7 seed Quinnipiac. They were invited to the College Basketball Invitational where they lost in the first round to Jacksonville State.

Roster

Schedule and results

|-
!colspan=12 style=| Non-Conference Regular season

|-
!colspan=9 style=| MAAC regular season

|-
!colspan=12 style=| MAAC tournament
|-

|-

References

Canisius Golden Griffins men's basketball seasons
Canisius Golden Griffins
Canisius Golden Griffins men's basketball team
Canisius Golden Griffins men's basketball team